Club Sportivo Alsina, or simply Sportivo Alsina is an Argentine sports club from Valentín Alsina, Buenos Aires that played in tournaments organised by the Argentine Football Association from the 1920s to the 1940s, even reaching the Primera División in 1933 and 1934.

The club is headquartered on the corner of Choele Choel and Juan Domingo Perón streets in Valentín Alsina.

Although football is no longer practised at competitive levels in Sportivo Alsina, the club hosts the practise of other disciplines such as baby football, basketball, roller skating and volleyball.

History 
The club was established on October 17, 1916, in Valentín Alsina district of Greater Buenos Aires under the name "El Aeroplano", In 1922 the football section separated from the club, adopting the name "Sportivo Alsina" honoring the district where the club had been established.

The football squad began to compete that same year, achieving its first title in 1925 when the team won the Tercera División championship organised by dissident Asociación Amateurs de Football (AAm).

In 1932 the club won the División Intermedia (the third level by then) championship, which allowed Sportivo Alsina to play at Primera División. One year later, the club would win another Tercera División championship playing with a reserve team.

Sportivo Alsina debuted in the Argentine top division, Primera División, in 1933 where the squad finished 5° of 20 teams. Sportivo Alsina continued to play at the top-flight until 1934 where all the clubs of the amateur league (AFA) were relegated as it merged with the professional one, Liga Argentina de Football.

Sportivo Alsina disaffiliated from the Association in 1948. Since then, the institution has focused on several disciplines, practised at amateur level.

Notable players
 Angel Grippa, the team's goalkeeper, was part of the Argentina national team at the 1934 FIFA World Cup. In 1936 and 1941 Sportivo Alsina would win two championships else in the third division of Argentine football league system.

Honours 
 División Intermedia (1): 1932
 Primera C (4): 1925 AAm, 1933,  1936, 1941

Notes

References

External links

 

Association football clubs established in 1916
Football clubs disaffiliated from the Argentine Football Association
Lanús Partido